Siemyśl  (German Simötzel) is a village in Kołobrzeg County, West Pomeranian Voivodeship, in north-western Poland. It is the seat of the gmina (administrative district) called Gmina Siemyśl.

For the history of the region, see History of Pomerania.

The village has a population of 510.

References

Villages in Kołobrzeg County